Škultéty (Slovak spelling) or Skultéty (Hungarian spelling) is a surname originated form the German word Schultheiß. Notable people with this surname include:
August Horislav Škultéty (1819-1892), Slovak writer, pedagogue, and ethnographer
László Skultéty (1738-1831), the longest serving Hungarian Hussar in Hungarian history
 (1853-1948), Slovak literary critic, historian , linguist, publicist and translator
 (1923-2011), Slovak and Czechoslovak Communist politician and M.P.
 (born 1972) – Czech translator from German

See also

Slovak-language surnames
Surnames of German origin
Occupational surnames